Artabazos I of Characene was a king of Characene, a vassal state of the Parthians, His short reign lasted only from 49/48-48/47 BC.

Like most kings of Characene, he is known only from numismatic sources,
A unique tetradrachm, is dated DXS (48-47 b.c.) and displays on the reverse an extended Greek inscription basileōs artabazo theopatoros aytokratoros sōtēros philopatoros kai philellēnos translates “of the king Artabazes, of divine descent, ruler in his own right, the deliverer, who loves his father and the Greeks” The square arrangement of this epithet spaced around a typical Greek Heracles, is copied from the conventional style of contemporary Parthian coinage.  

His name was hellenised as, like his predecessor, his coin described him as Soter(savoir) .

He is perhaps also mentioned by Lucian (Macrobii, 15). According to him he was 86 years when came to power.

References
 

Kings of Characene
1st-century BC monarchs in the Middle East
Year of birth missing
Year of death missing
1st-century BC rulers
1st-century BC deaths